Mary F. Sammons (born 1946) is an American businesswoman who formerly served as the CEO, and is the former chairperson, of Rite Aid. She was formerly the president and CEO of Fred Meyer.

Biography
Mary F. Sammons was born in 1946 and hails from Portland, Oregon. She graduated from Marylhurst University (at the time Marylhurst College) and St. Mary's Academy.

Sammons worked at Fred Meyer Stores for 26 years and held the position of President and CEO until 1999.

In 1999, Sammons became President/COO of Rite Aid. In 2003, Sammons became the CEO of Rite Aid. In 2010, she stepped down from her position as CEO and remained Chairman until 2012.

In 2009, Forbes named her the 21st most powerful woman in the world.

References

External links
Profile of Mary F. Sammons from answers.com

Businesspeople from Portland, Oregon
Marylhurst University alumni
1946 births
Living people
American women chief executives
American retail chief executives
St. Mary's Academy (Portland, Oregon) alumni